Pseudogonatodes gasconi is a species of lizard in the family Sphaerodactylidae . It is endemic to Brazil and known from the state of Acre.

References

Pseudogonatodes
Reptiles of Brazil
Endemic fauna of Brazil
Reptiles described in 2000
Taxa named by Marinus Steven Hoogmoed
Taxa named by Teresa C.S. Ávila-Pires